Danish Ali (born 1 April 1983) is a Pakistani Canadian  Standup Comedian, Actor, Physician, Social Media Personality formerly based in Pakistan and now in Canada.

Career 
He is the first Pakistani comedian to be invited on a U.S. Department of State sponsored comedy tour of the United States, performing in venues such as Dartmouth College and the New York Friars Club along with performances in Providence, Rhode Island and Worcester, Massachusetts.

He wrote and hosted Pakistan's first English language comedy television show, The Real News along with Saad Haroon. He is one of the first comedians to perform in cities across Pakistan in English and is also a member of the improvisational comedy troupe, 'Shark'.

He has also made his television debut in Hum TV's series Hum Tum as Umer (Adam's friend)

References

External links 
 
 Danish Ali on Instagram

Living people
Place of birth missing (living people)
Pakistani male comedians
Pakistani emigrants to Canada
Naturalized citizens of Canada
Pakistani radio personalities
Pakistani YouTubers
1983 births